Roddy Gribben (1924/5-2017) was an Irish Gaelic footballer who played in the 1958 All-Ireland Final. He was a brother of Owen, Willie, Hugh Francis, Mickey and Henry, who all lined out beside him at various stages.

References

Derry inter-county Gaelic footballers
1920s births
Place of birth missing
2017 deaths
Place of death missing